The Men's 100 metres at the 2015 Asian Athletics Championships was held on the 3 and 4 of June.

Medalists

Records

Schedule

Results

Round 1
Qualification rule: The first four finishers in each heat (Q) plus the four fastest times of those who finished fourth or lower in their heat (q) qualified.

Heat 1

Heat 2

Heat 3

Heat 4

Heat 5

Round 1 Result

Semi-final
Qualification rule: First 2 in each heat(Q) and the next 2 fastest(q).

Heat 1

Heat 2

Heat 3

Semi-finals Result

Final

References
Results

100
100 metres at the Asian Athletics Championships